Sclerophrys asmarae, also known as the Asmara toad (ኣስመራ ጋዝዕ), is a species of toad in the family Bufonidae. It is named after its type locality, the capital city of Eritrea, Asmara. It is found on the Ethiopian Highlands on both sides of the Rift Valley, with the western population extending north into Eritrea. Its natural habitats are montane grasslands, and tentatively at lower elevations, arid savanna. It is a locally common and adaptable species that is impacted by habitat degradation, though probably without posing a serious risk.

Taxonomy
Sclerophrys asmarae was first described from Ethiopia in 1982 by Tandy, Bogart, Largen, and Feener, who named it Bufo asmarae. It is one of only two known bisexual polyploid species of Bufo and has a karyotype of 2n=40. It seems to be closely related to Sclerophrys kerinyagae and  the African common toad (Sclerophrys regularis) which are diploid species. The ranges of these three species overlap and because of its chromosome number, A. asmarae must have evolved from one or other of these species. Slight differences in voice and certain reproduction isolating mechanisms are evident between the three species. Further hybridisation is probably prevented by spatial constraints involving altitude preferences.

Status
Sclerophrys asmarae  is threatened primarily by human settlement and agriculture. However, it seems to be an adaptable species able to adapt to degradation of its grassland habitat by grazing. As habitat destruction is slow, and this species is common in some locations, the International Union for Conservation of Nature (IUCN) has assessed its conservation status as being of "least concern".

References

asmarae
Frogs of Africa
Vertebrates of Eritrea
Amphibians of Ethiopia
Amphibians described in 1982
Taxonomy articles created by Polbot